The Valea Mare is a left tributary of the river Nadăș in Romania. It flows into the Nadăș near Nădășelu.

References

Rivers of Romania
Rivers of Cluj County